Bridget Buckley (born 25 June 1955) is a British rower. She competed in the women's coxed four event at the 1980 Summer Olympics.

References

External links
 

1955 births
Living people
British female rowers
Olympic rowers of Great Britain
Rowers at the 1980 Summer Olympics
Place of birth missing (living people)